Since the late 1990s, more than 70 albums have been certified in Romania in accordance with the certification levels set up by the Uniunea Producătorilor de Fonograme din România (UPFR). Established in 1996, the UPFR is the first Romanian trade association of music producers, with the purpose of promoting the professional interests of its members, as well as being involved in anti-piracy. It has been advised by Monitorul Oficial, the official gazette of Romania, to function as a collective management organisation and collector of compensatory remuneration in the country. Although never publicly defined, the UPFR's certification levels have been repeatedly lowered since their introduction. When considering an album's certification level, the UPFR considers both its unit sales and its sales price. This is atypical when compared to the methods of other organizations. For example, in 2006 an album costing  or more would need to achieve 2,000 unit sales to be awarded a gold certification, while one costing less than €7 would need 10,000.

The first known release to be certified in Romania was the album Best Of by Romanian singer Mirabela Dauer, which received a gold certification in 1995. The only other artists to receive a diamond award are Animal X, who received six for their first six albums, Andra and Sandel Mihai, for selling 60,000 copies of their 2007 album De la frate la soră and Indila, for selling 650,000 copies of her 2014 album Mini World. From lowest to highest, the certifications that have been awarded over the years are gold, double gold, platinum, double platinum, triple platinum, quadruple platinum, diamond and triple diamond. The artist with the most certified albums is Romanian group Animal X, who has received seven awards. In 2004, three of Bambi's studio albums received a single gold certification, as their combined sales totaled the required 100,000 units. From the late 2000s onwards, sales of albums in Romania have declined, as a result of music piracy and financial crises. Consequently, fewer album certifications have been awarded.

By certification

See also 
List of music recording certifications

Notes

References

Romania
Romanian music awards
Romania